The Sebenza is a folding pocket knife manufactured by Chris Reeve Knives of Boise, Idaho.  It is constructed with a stainless steel blade and titanium handle.  Its handle functions as the lock mechanism similar in concept to the Walker linerlock differing in that the handle itself forms the lock bar which holds the blade open.  This mechanism was invented by Chris Reeve, and is called the Reeve Integral Lock (R.I.L).  It is also commonly referred to as the Framelock, and is one of the most widely implemented locking systems in the folding knife industry, where lock strength and reliability is a product requirement.  The name Sebenza is derived from the Zulu word meaning "Work," a tribute to Mr. Reeve's South African origins.

Design and history 

There are currently two size models of the Sebenza 31, small and large. The Small 31 has a 2.99" (76.17mm) blade and the Large 31 has a 3.61" (91.69mm) blade.

First introduced in 1990, the current basic model has a sand-blasted titanium handle and a stonewashed finish CPM S35VN steel blade.
There are numerous options for the embellishment of the Sebenza's titanium handles, such as computer-generated graphics, custom (unique) graphics, or inlays such as exotic wood, micarta, or mammoth ivory.
Originally the Chris Reeve Sebenza was available with a blade of ATS-34 steel.  
In 1996, the blade material was changed to BG-42 blade steel, and later in 2001, the Sebenza blade material transitioned to CPM S30V steel.  CPM S30V was developed by Crucible Steel with the collaboration of Chris Reeve.  Damascus steel blades are also available as an option on the Sebenza. Since 2012, all Chris Reeve knives have transitioned to CPM S35VN steel.
A feature of the Sebenza that is highly praised by users is the ease of maintenance, as CRK actually encourages the customer to disassemble and maintain the knife by including a hex wrench, as well as small tube of fluorinated grease (to lubricate the pivot) and a tube of Loctite (for screws) in the box. Another feature of the Sebenza is the use of a bushing system around the blade's pivot that keeps the blade at a constant tight fit which is always centered.
This bushing allows the user to tighten the pivot screw completely without having to manually adjust the pivot tension.

As of May 2008, the two production models—the Regular and Classic Sebenza models—were discontinued and replaced by the 'Sebenza 21' (named so as to commemorate the 21st year of the Sebenza's production).  The Sebenza 21 is based upon the previous Classic's design, and differs from the Classic only in small details.

At the 2012 Blade Show the 'Sebenza 25' (named so as to commemorate the 25th year of the Sebenza's production) was introduced.  Significant changes include a more sculpted handle, the introduction of a ceramic ball lockup/detent system and the use of 'Large Hollow Grind Technology" on the blade grind.  The 21 model continues in production as well. The 'Sebenza 25' was discontinued in mid-2016 and replaced by the Inkosi which shares many similarities with the 25 but with additional refinements.

In 2019, Chris Reeve Knives released the Sebenza 31, replacing the 21. This model featured minor improvements again, similar to the 25. Most notably the ceramic lockbar interface and a new inlay design. Additionally, a hole has been removed from the handles, and the pocket clip is slightly offset so that it no longer rests on the lockbar.

Awards 
1987:  Knifemaker’s Guild of Southern Africa -- "Best Folding Knife" (Sebenza predecessor)
1993:  Knifemakers' Guild -- "Most Innovative Folder at the Show" 
2005:  Blade Show -- "Collector Knife of the Year" (21st Anniversary Sebenza) 
2006:  Grays Sporting Journal -- “Gray's Best” Award

Knives Illustrated magazine named the industry's top five tactical folders of all time.
The author, Abe Elias, describes a tactical folder as "a knife used by people who need a dependable piece of solidly build equipment, a folder that gives you -- in all cases -- confidence".
His article goes on to say that "At the top of the list is the Sebenza by Chris Reeve."

References

External links 
 Description on Chris Reeve Knives homepage

Pocket knives
Mechanical hand tools
Camping equipment
Goods manufactured in the United States